Michael Hext (born c.1961) is a trombonist in the Orchestra of the Royal Opera House.  In 1978 he was the inaugural winner of the BBC Young Musician of the Year Competition.

Career 
Michael Hext was educated at Bedford Modern School.  In 1978, at the age of 17, he became the inaugural winner of the BBC Young Musician of the Year Competition.  Following study at the Royal College of Music with John Iveson, Hext has become a successful orchestral trombonist but performs on occasions as a soloist, including a tour with the European Union Youth Orchestra conducted by Claudio Abbado. He has performed recitals and concertos at the Wigmore Hall, the Royal Festival Hall, the Queen Elizabeth Hall and many other concert halls. He has also had a number of pieces written for him including a concerto by Edward Gregson (pub. Novello).

Amongst a wide variety of freelance performances he played with the Philip Jones Brass Ensemble. In 1983 he joined the Halle Orchestra as Principal Trombone. After one year he took up the same position with the London Philharmonic Orchestra for nine years.

For a period Michael Hext was Professor of Trombone at the Royal Academy of Music and then the Royal College of Music.  Since joining the Orchestra of the Royal Opera House on Principal Trombone he moved to Sub-principal Trombone in 2000.

References

1961 births
Living people
People educated at Bedford Modern School
British classical trombonists
Male trombonists
Alumni of the Royal College of Music
Academics of the Royal Academy of Music
Academics of the Royal College of Music
20th-century classical trombonists
21st-century classical trombonists
20th-century British male musicians
21st-century British male musicians